Madiha, born Madiha Khawaja, is a Dutch singer and songwriter of American R&B and Pop music.

Based in the Netherlands, Madiha is known for her feature on the MSN Video reality show The Biz and her opening performance for Grammy Award-winning artist Ne-Yo at Heineken Music Hall.

On July 14, 2011, Madiha released "The Invitation," her mixtape executive produced by Young Trey who has produced for Mack 10, Ice Cube, and Fat Joe. 
The mixtape is made-up of an international production cast including Redd Lights (Iceland based production duo), New Zealand's Ben Walker, ATL native Caddalak Beatz (Nipsey Hussle, Travis Porter), Canada's Beatz Cartel, and Virginia newcomer VQ.

Featured artists include Izza Kizza (Decon Records), C-Ride (Epidemic/Cash Money Records), and Ariez Onasis (Dice Music Group).

Biography
Growing up with a Moroccan mother and Pakistani father, Madiha was exposed to a variety of cultural experiences, with music resonating the most with her. Listening to Indian music, Moroccan music, and American R&B, she began dancing and winning talent competitions across her country. As she won dance trophies, she became interested in singing. "My mama told me when I was younger that I used to hum when I went to sleep, and when I grew up it turned into singing," Madiha says.

After singing Alicia Keys’ "Fallin’" for her sisters at age 11, her family realized her ability to sing. "That’s when I got to go to the studios and record, participated in many more talent shows, and started taking vocal classes," she says.

Her recognition began with a MSN Video reality show called The Biz. The show would take four individuals and lead them to opportunities that would make their dreams reality. Though thousands of people auditioned, Madiha was chosen as one of the four to be on the show as the only recording artist. From that point they started to manage Madiha.

At 18, she recorded at Global Studios Amsterdam. She also met and receive advice from Dru Hill, Sisqό, Silk, and Horace Brown. Revisiting her dancing roots she worked with choreographer Jake Impenge (JDF Studios), who has prepared dancers to perform with international artists like Janet Jackson, Usher and Justin Timberlake.

Her work on The Biz concluded with an opening performance for Grammy Award-winning artist Ne-Yo at Heineken Music Hall. In front of over five thousand people, Madiha performed a song she wrote called "Super Star."

With the help of her American team including A&R Sony P (FL), executive producer Young Trey (CA), and "TeamMadiva" (worldwide), Madiha’s introductory mixtape, "The Invitation" hosted by Hoodrich Entertainment’s own DJ Furious Styles (Washington, D.C.), was released July 14, 2011.

Discography

Mixtape
 The Invitation

References

External links
 

Year of birth missing (living people)
Living people
Dutch singer-songwriters